The men's 800 metre freestyle at the 2009 World Championships occurred on the morning of Tuesday, 28 July (heats) and the evening Wednesday 29 July (final) at the Foro Italico in Rome, Italy.

Records

The following records were established during the competition:

Results

Heats

Final

See also
Swimming at the 2007 World Aquatics Championships – Men's 800 metre freestyle (previous World Championships)

References

Freestyle Men 800
World Aquatics Championships